The Fijian Drua (currently known as the Swire Shipping Fijian Drua for sponsorship reasons) is a professional rugby union team based in Fiji that competes in the Super Rugby. The team was created by the Fiji Rugby Union and launched in August 2017, shortly before the 2017 National Rugby Championship. The team previously competed in the Australian National Rugby Championship competition between 2017 and 2019, when the tournament was disbanded.

On 14 April 2021, New Zealand Rugby Union confirmed the side had been granted a licence to join the Super Rugby competition.

National Rugby Championship

In July 2017, the Fiji Rugby Union announced that they would enter a team in the Australian domestic National Rugby Championship from the 2017 season onwards following successful negotiations with the Australian Rugby Union, with home matches being played in Suva as well as regional cities Lautoka and Sigatoka. On 25 July, Senirusi Seruvakula was named as the head coach of the team for their inaugural season, and a few days later the first players were invited to a training camp.

The team's name, logo and kit was revealed on 16 August 2017, with the FRU announcing that the team would be known as the Fijian Drua.

In their first year of competition in NRC 2017, the Drua won three of their first four matches to be well placed at the midpoint of the season, but then lost three of their remaining four matches to finish in third place. The team was well beaten by the eventual Champions  in their semifinal.

The Drua finished on top of the table after the regular season in the following year, losing only one match away to Queensland Country. In the last round they won the Horan-Little Shield by defeating Perth Spirit away in Perth, before beating  in their semifinal at home in Lautoka. In the final, played at the same venue a week later, the Drua avenged their previous losses to Queensland Country with a 36–26 win to take the 2018 National Rugby Championship title.

The 2019 season saw the Drua once again make the playoffs, finishing with three wins, two draws and two defeats. This would be their last match in the tournament as the tournament was disbanded following a change in TV deal at the end of 2020, with the 2020 edition having been cancelled due to the COVID-19 pandemic.

Super Rugby
The 2021 Super Rugby season, still affected by the COVID-19 pandemic, was played in two regionalised tournaments featuring the five New Zealand Super Rugby sides and the four Australian Super Rugby sides, plus the Western Force who had returned to the tournament having lost their licence at the end of the 2017 Super Rugby season. However, from 2022 onwards a new 12-team tournament had been mooted, and on 13 November 2020, the New Zealand Rugby Union announced the Fijian Drua, along with the Moana Pasifika as its preferred partners to join the competition. Further steps were made in March 2021, when the New Zealand Rugby Union agreed to a sharing of broadcast revenue with both the Drua and Moana Pasifika, and this was followed later in the same month by World Rugby announcing financial, high performance and administrative support for both potential new sides, in order to boost the performances of Pacific Islands at international level, while also being able to stay local instead of heading overseas.

On 14 April 2021, both sides were granted licences to join Super Rugby in 2022 by the New Zealand Rugby Union.

On 30 August 2021, the side was confirmed in Super Rugby for the 2022 and 2023 seasons, beginning with the 2022 Super Rugby Pacific season. The team will be based in Suva, however for the 2022 season, the team will be based in Australia due to travel restrictions as a consequence of the COVID-19 pandemic, with the Lake Ainsworth Sports and Recreation Centre in Lennox Head, New South Wales confirmed as the teams base for the 2022 season in November 2021.

The team will be coached by Mick Byrne for 2022 and 2023.

On 21 January 2022, Nemani Nagusa was named captain for the 2022 season.

Name and colours

The team is named after the drua, a traditional Fijian double canoe that served as warships in naval battles. The team's logo originally pictured a drua stylised inside a rugby ball, to symbolise Fijian players' speed, agility and flair. It was replaced when the team joined Super Rugby, with the new logo picturing a drua. The Fijian Drua colours while participating in the National Rugby Championship were sky blue, black and white.

Sponsorship

When the team competed in the National Rugby Championship, Fiji Airways were the principal sponsor for the Drua, signing a five-year deal in late 2017, and ISC were their kit manufacturer. The team was also sponsored by Paradise Beverages, with the Fiji Gold Beer logo and the Ratu Rum brand appearing on the sleeves and back of the jersey.

On 27 October 2021, New Balance were announced as the official apparel partner for the team in Super Rugby on a three-year deal. On 11 November 2021, Rooster Chicken were announced as one of the teams jersey sponsors on a three-year deal, while on 16 November 2021, PacificAus (a sports programme set up by the Australian government) were announced as sponsors of the team on a three-year deal. On 17 November 2021, during the teams kit reveal for the 2022 season, Swire Shipping were announced as the teams naming rights sponsor for 2022, while Fiji Airways will return to sponsor the side as a jersey sponsor.

Stadiums
While participating in the National Rugby Championship between 2017 and 2019, the Drua played their fixtures at ANZ Stadium, Suva (2017 and 2019), Churchill Park (2017, 2018 and 2019), Lawaqa Park (2017 and 2019) and Ratu Cakobau Park (2018) in Fiji.

For Super Rugby, the Drua will play at least one fixture in Fiji during the 2022 Super Rugby Pacific season, playing at ANZ Stadium, Suva in Round 7. A further match in Fiji could take place in 2022, with the rest of the Drua's home matches taking place in Australia, with the CommBank Stadium in Parramatta, Leichhardt Oval in Sydney and Suncorp Stadium in Brisbane being confirmed as hosting venues. Due to flooding in the Brisbane area of Australia, the Sunshine Coast Stadium in Kawana Waters was used for their round 3 match, while following the relaxation of COVID-19 restrictions, the Drua were able to reschedule their round 15 match so it could be played in Fiji, at Churchill Park.

Current squad

The squad for the 2023 Super Rugby Pacific season is:

Coaching staff
The following coaching team was appointed for the 2022 Super Rugby Pacific season:

Records

Honours
National Rugby Championship
Champions:  2018
Playoff appearances: 2017, 2019
Horan-Little Shield
Season winners: 2018

Season standings
National Rugby Championship
{| class="wikitable" style="text-align:center;"
|- border=1 cellpadding=5 cellspacing=0
! style="width:20px;"|Year
! style="width:20px;"|Pos
! style="width:20px;"|Pld
! style="width:20px;"|W
! style="width:20px;"|D
! style="width:20px;"|L
! style="width:20px;"|F
! style="width:20px;"|A
! style="width:25px;"|+/-
! style="width:20px;"|BP
! style="width:20px;"|Pts
! style="width:25em; text-align:left;"|  Play-offs
|-
|2019
|3rd
| 7 || 3 || 2 || 2 || 231 || 214 || +17 || 3 || 17
|align=left|  
|-
|2018
|1st
| 7 || 6 || 0 || 1 || 283 || 175 ||+108 || 3 || 27
|-
|2017
|3rd
| 8 || 4 || 0 || 4 || 261 || 245 || +16 || 6 || 22
|align=left|  
|}

Head coaches
 Mick Byrne (2022–)
 Senirusi Seruvakula (2017–2019)

Captains
 Nemani Nagusa (2022–)
 Eremasi Radrodro (2019)
 Mosese Voka (2018)
 John Stewart (2017)

See also

 Fijian Latui
 Fiji Warriors

References

External links
 

2017 establishments in Fiji
Rugby clubs established in 2017
National Rugby Championship
Super Rugby teams
Fijian rugby union teams
Diaspora sports clubs in Australia
Fijian Drua